Welbeck Publishing Group, formerly Carlton Publishing Group, is a London-based independent book publisher of fiction, narrative and illustrated non-fiction, as well as gift and children's books. Established in 2019 by Executive Directors Mark Smith and Marcus Leaver, the business specialises in commercial publishing in 30 languages and in more than 60 countries around the world, across all genres and categories.

Welbeck's imprints include Welbeck (Fiction and Non-Fiction), Balance (Lifestyle and MBS), Orange Hippo! (gifts), Welbeck Children's, Flame (Middle-Grade Fiction) and Mountain Leopard Press (Literary and Translations).

Notable authors include Paul McKenna, Jessie Cave, Linda Calvey, Ruby Wax, Freya North, Dr Hilary Jones and Simon Thomas.

References

External links
Official website

Book publishing companies based in London
British companies established in 2019
Publishing companies established in 2019